Exiguobacterium aestuarii is a Gram-variable and rod-shaped bacterium from the genus of Exiguobacterium which has been isolated from tidal flat from the beach of Daepo in Korea.

References

Bacillaceae
Bacteria described in 2005